, provisional designation: , is a resonant trans-Neptunian object in the Kuiper belt, a circumstellar disc located in the outermost region of the Solar System. It was discovered on 23 May 2001, by American astronomer Marc Buie at the Cerro Tololo Observatory in Chile. The object is locked in a 4:7 orbital resonance with Neptune. , it has not been named.

Discovery 

 was first observed near its perihelion on 23 May 2001, using the 4-meter Blanco Telescope at Cerro Tololo Inter-American Observatory in Chile. During the same night,  were also discovered. Besides Marc Buie, who is solely credited with the discovery of this object, the Minor Planet Electronic Circular also mentions James Elliot, Lawrence Wasserman, Robert Millis and Susan Kern as observers and measurers, respectively. Follow-up observations with the 6.5-meter Baade Telescope (Magellan) at the Las Campanas Observatory were made three weeks later. The body's observation arc begins with its official discovery observation at Cerro Tololo on 23 May 2001.

Orbit and classification 

This minor planet orbits the Sun at a distance of 36.1–51.9 AU once every 291 years and 7 months (106,514 days; semi-major axis of 43.98 AU). Its orbit has an eccentricity of 0.18 and an inclination of 3° with respect to the ecliptic. The object came to perihelion in 2002. , it is 37.0 AU from the Sun and has an apparent magnitude of 22.8.

 is a resonant trans-Neptunian object that stays in a 4:7 mean-motion orbital resonance with Neptune, orbiting exactly four times the Sun for every seven orbits Neptune does. The classification is deemed secure. The 4:7 resonance is located at 43.7 AU in the midst of the classical objects of the Kuiper belt, a circumstellar disc of typically non-resonant bodies, contrary to the more prominent resonant plutinos (2:3) and twotinos (1:2) which form the inner and outer rim of the Kuiper belt, respectively.

Numbering and naming 

This minor planet was numbered by the Minor Planet Center on 16 November 2005, receiving the number  in the minor planet catalog. , it has not been named. According to the established naming conventions, it will be given a mythological name associated with the underworld or with creation.

Physical characteristics 

A red surface color is typically associated with the presence of tholins, polymer-like organic compounds, formed by long exposures to solar and cosmic radiation. A higher B−R magnitude of  including B−V and V−R color indices of 1.544 and 0.574, respectively, were previously published in 2004.

As of 2021, no rotational lightcurve for this body has been obtained from photometric observations. Its rotation period, pole and shape, as well as its composition remain unknown.

References

External links 
 MPEC 2002-F33 : 2001 KP77 (revision), Minor Planet Electronic Circular, 20 March 2002
 List of Transneptunian Objects, Minor Planet Center
 (119070) 2001 KP77, Small Bodies Data Ferret
 Discovery Circumstances: Numbered Minor Planets (115001)-(120000), Minor Planet Center
 TNO/centaur eccentricities vs. semimajor axes and resonance objects, Johnston's Archive, 2015
 
 

119070
Discoveries by Marc Buie
20010523